Neil Young in Berlin is a live video by Neil Young, directed by Michael Lindsay-Hogg, and recorded in October 1982 during the European Tour for his album Trans. It includes the song "After Berlin" written especially for that concert and only performed once.

It was first issued on VHS and later on LaserDisc and DVD.

Reception

Writing for Allmusic, critic William Ruhlman called the video "a good summary of Young's career, from "Cinnamon Girl" to the then-current Trans."

Track listing
All songs written by Neil Young.
 "Cinnamon Girl"
 "Computer Age"
 "Little Thing Called Love"
 "Old Man"
 "The Needle and the Damage Done"
 "After the Gold Rush"
 "Transformer Man"   
 "Sample and Hold"
 "Like a Hurricane"   
 "Hey Hey My My"
 "After Berlin"

On the DVD, "Like a Hurricane" is omitted in the track list on the back cover, but is still present on the disc.

Personnel
Neil Young – vocal, guitar
Ralph Molina – drums
Nils Lofgren – guitar
Bruce Palmer – bass
Ben Keith – pedal steel, lap steel, keyboards
Joe Lala – percussion
Joel Bernstein – Synthesizer
Larry Cragg – banjo

References

External links 
 

Concert films
Neil Young live albums
1986 video albums
1986 live albums
Live video albums
Rhino Records live albums
Rhino Records video albums
Films directed by Michael Lindsay-Hogg